Panchatantra is a 2019 Indian Kannada romantic drama film written and directed by Yogaraj Bhat and produced by Yogaraj Cinemas in association with JASP Productions and Purple Patch. The film stars Vihan Gowda, Akshara Gowda and Sonal Monteiro in the lead roles. The score and soundtrack for the film is composed by V. Harikrishna and the cinematography is by Sugnan.

Synopsis 
The plot of the film revolves around two rival groups who are always ready to insult, ridicule and put each other down at every opportunity they get. Sixty-year-old Rangappa, a real estate dealer owns a complex out of which he has sold a few of his shops and is managing the property well. The 24-year-old Karthik is an orphan, who, along with his three friends, looks after the garage owned by Appaiah Bond, an old hunk who is passionate about car races. While Rangappa is fighting a legal battle with Appaiah, his daughter, least bothered about all this, falls in love with Karthik. Will Rangappa approve of this relationship? Will Rangappa and Appaiah figure out a way to resolve their dispute?

Target audience 
The film reportedly is targeted at the youth section of the country and features an exclusive Car rally race which was shot between Bangalore and Mysore. The teaser of the film was released on 15 October 2018 and received mixed reviews. The film is set to be remade in Telugu and Hindi languages with Bhat reprising the director's role. The movie got mixed reviews and did average collections at the box office.

Cast 
 Vihan Gowda as Karthik
 Akshara Gowda as Artha
 Sonal Monteiro as Sahitya
 Rangayana Raghu as Ranganna
 Deepak Shetty
 Bala Rajwadi
 Ramamurthy as Artha's father
 Simran Mishrikoti as Sheeba
 Diganth as himself (cameo appearance)

Soundtrack
V. Harikrishna has scored the soundtrack and score for the film, making his seventh collaboration with the director Yogaraj Bhat. To promote voting in the 2018 Karnataka Legislative Assembly election held in May 2018, the Election commission hired the film's team to create an anthem and spread awareness among the Youth section. Yogaraj Bhat wrote the lyrics with Harikrishna's music and Vijay Prakash vocals.

The first single track of the film "Shrungarada Honge Mara" was released on 25 December 2018 and was widely appreciated for its lyrical content by Bhat and choreography by Imran Sardhariya.

References

External links 
 
  Panchatantra (2018)

2019 films
2010s Kannada-language films
2010s romantic action films
Indian romantic action films
Films scored by V. Harikrishna
Films shot in Karnataka